The 2017–18 season was Doncaster Rovers's 139th season in their existence, 15th consecutive season in the Football League and first back in League One following promotion last season. Along with League One, the club also participated in the FA Cup, EFL Cup and EFL Trophy.

The season covered the period from 1 July 2017 to 30 June 2018.

Squad

Detailed overview 
League caps and goals up to the start of season 2017–18.
Players with name and squad number struck through and marked  left the club during the playing season.

Statistics 
This includes any players featured in a match day squad in any competition.

|-
|colspan="14"|Players who left the club during the season:

|}

Goals record
.

Disciplinary record
.

Transfers

Transfers in

Transfers out

Loans in

Loans out

Competitions

Friendlies

League One

League table

Results summary

Results by matchday

Matches
On 21 June 2017, the league fixtures were announced.

FA Cup
In the FA Cup, Doncaster Rovers were drawn away to Ebbsfleet United in the first round, Scunthorpe United at home in the second round and Rochdale at home in the third round.

EFL Cup
On 16 June 2017, Doncaster Rovers were drawn away to Bradford City in the first round. A home tie versus Hull City was confirmed for the second round. An away trip to Premier League side Arsenal was drawn for the third round.

EFL Trophy
On 12 July 2017, the group stage draw was complete with Doncaster Rovers facing Grimsby Town, Scunthorpe United and Sunderland U23s in Northern Group H. After finishing second in the group stages, Doncaster Rovers were drawn away to Rochdale in the second round.

References

Doncaster Rovers F.C. seasons
Doncaster Rovers